The Toyota Y engine is a series of overhead valve straight-four petrol engines manufactured by Toyota from 1982 through 1996. The Y engine has mostly been used in commercial and off-road vehicles.

The valve arrangement from the Toyota K engine is interchangeable with this engine.

Translated from Japanese Wiki :ja:トヨタ・Y型エンジン

1Y
There is also the 1Y-J, with the "J" suffix meaning that the engine is built to meet emission standards for light commercial vehicles.
OHV, eight valves
Displacement: 
Bore × stroke: 
Reference output: ,  (gross figures, apply to both 1Y and 1Y-J)
Applications:
 Toyota HiAce truck
 Toyota LiteAce (YM20, first generation)
 Toyota ToyoAce
 Toyota TownAce (YR10)

2Y
The 2Y engine is an OHV, eight valve construction just like the 1Y. There are also 2Y-J and 2Y-U engines with differing emissions control equipment.

OHV, eight valves
Displacement: 
Bore × stroke: 
Compression ratio: 8.8:1
Reference output (2Y):  at 5,000 rpm,  at 3,200 rpm (net),  (gross)
Applications:
5th generation Toyota Mark II Van (YX76V, 2Y-J)
3rd generation Toyota HiAce van (YH50V/60V)
 Toyota Hilux
 Toyota TownAce van (YR25V)
 Toyota LiteAce wagon (YM20/30G)
 Volkswagen Taro (a rebadged Hilux)

2Y-P
OHV 8 valve (LPG)
Displacement: 
Bore × stroke: 
Specifications:  4,600 rpm  2,200 rpm (net)  5,000 rpm  3,000 rpm (gross)
LPG
Applications: 
 Toyota Corona (YT140)
 Toyota Mark II (YX70)

3Y
There is also the emissions cleaned 3Y-U engine. A version of the 3Y is built by the Shenyang Xinguang-Brilliance Automobile Engine Co. in China as the 4G20B; this engine meets the Euro IV emissions standards.

OHV 8 valve, carburetted
Displacement: 
Bore × stroke: 
Compression ratio: 8.8:1
Reference output:  at 4,800 rpm,  at 3,400 rpm
Applications: 
 3rd generation Toyota HiAce truck/van/wagon (YH51G/61G/71G)
 Hilux
 Dyna/ToyoAce
 Aug 1983–Aug 1987 Crown (YS120, export models)

3Y-C
This is the low emissions carburetted motor with catalytic converter exhaust system
OHV 8 valve
Displacement: 
Inside Bore × Stroke: 
Compression ratio: 8.8:1
Reference output:  at 4600 rpm,  at 3400 rpm

Applications:
LiteAce XTRA TRACK Wagon (YM40-RGMDSQ), (YM41-RVMDSQ)
 Toyota Townace Van (YR39)

3Y-E
OHV 8 valve, fuel injection
Displacement: 
Bore × stroke: 
Compression ratio: 8.8:1
Reference output:  at 4,800 rpm,  at 3,800 rpm
Applications: 
 Feb 1993–Apr 1997 Toyota Mark II (YX78V, fifth generation)
 Aug 1988–Dec 1995 Mark II (YX80)
 Apr 1989–Aug 1991 Hilux Surf (YN130G)
 Daihatsu Rocky (F75, F85 - Australia 1988 model year only)
 1996 Toyota Classic

3Y-EU
OHV 8 valve, fuel injection and emissions equipment
Displacement: 
Bore × stroke: 
Reference output:  at 5000 rpm,  at 3600 rpm (gross) at 4800 rpm,  at 3800 rpm (net)
Applications: 
 Aug 1986–Mar1989 Hilux Surf/4Runner (YN61G)
 TownAce Wagon/MasterAce Surf (YR21G)
 Daihatsu Delta Wagon (YB21G)

3Y-P
OHV 8 valve (LPG)
Displacement: 
Bore × stroke: 
Output:  at 4,600 rpm,  at 3,000 rpm
Applications: 
 Sep1987–Aug1989 Crown Sedan (YS130)
 Aug1988–Dec 1995 Mark II sedan (YX80)

3Y-PU
OHV 8 valve (LPG, emissions equipment)
Displacement: 
Bore × stroke: 
Reference output:  at 5,000 rpm,  at 3,000 rpm (gross) at 4,600 rpm,  2,000 rpm (net)
Applications: 
 Aug 1983–Aug 1987 Crown (YS120)

3Y-PE
OHV 8 valve (LPG, fuel injection)
Displacement: 
Bore × stroke: 
Compression ratio: 10.5:1
Reference output:  at 4600 rpm,  at 2400 rpm (August 1989 until November 1995) at 4400 rpm,  at 2400 rpm (1995 December)
Applications:
 Aug 1989–Nov 1999 Crown (YS130)
 Dec 1995–Aug 2008 Comfort (YXS10)
 Dec 1995–Aug 2008 Comfort (YXS11)

4Y
OHV eight-valve
Displacement: 
Bore and stroke: 

This engine was available either carburetted (4Y) or fuel injected (4Y-E, called the GW491Q/LJ491Q and also 4G22B for Chinese manufacture).

Applications
 1987.09 - 1995.12 Toyota Crown (YS132, overseas specifications)
 Toyota Van (Town Ace overseas specification, Tarago in Australia)
 Hiace third generation (overseas specification)
 1979-1988 Toyota Stout (YK110)
 Daihatsu Delta
 1993-1995 Daihatsu Rocky F95
 Toyota Industries forklifts
 Toyota 4Runner (Australia)
 Volkswagen Taro
 1985–1997 Toyota Hilux fourth and fifth generation

References

Y engine
Straight-four engines
Gasoline engines by model